Navarino or Navarin may refer to:

Battle
 Battle of Navarino, 1827 naval battle off Navarino, Greece, now known as Pylos

Geography
 Navarino is the former name of Pylos, a Greek town on the Ionian Sea, where the 1827 battle took place
 Old Navarino castle, medieval fortress at Pylos
 New Navarino fortress, Ottoman fortress at Pylos
 Navarino, Wisconsin, a town, United States
 Navarino (community), Wisconsin, an unincorporated community, United States
 Navarino, former name of the Commune Cabo de Hornos, Chile
 Navarino Island, an island located in the Commune of Cabo de Hornos, Antártica Chilena Province, Chile
 Puerto Navarino, Chilean port facing the Beagle Channel in western Navarino Island, Chile

Vessels
 Russian battleship Navarin (1891)
 Navarin, Russian 
 , British World War II cargo ship, sunk in 1942 as part of Convoy PQ 17

Other uses
 Navarin (food), a French stew of lamb or mutton
 Navarinos, a race of shape-changing tourist aliens in the Doctor Who story Delta and the Bannermen